Leo Telivuo (14 November 1929 – 8 February 1970) was a Finnish swimmer. He competed in two events at the 1952 Summer Olympics.

References

External links
 

1929 births
1970 deaths
Finnish male freestyle swimmers
Olympic swimmers of Finland
Swimmers at the 1952 Summer Olympics
Swimmers from Helsinki
20th-century Finnish people